Grzegorz Pawłuszek (born 25 August 1970) is a retired Polish football striker.

References

1970 births
Living people
Polish footballers
Lechia Gdańsk players
Zawisza Bydgoszcz players
GKS Katowice players
Górnik Konin players
Polonia Warsaw players
OKS Stomil Olsztyn players
FC 08 Homburg players
Eisenhüttenstädter FC Stahl players
Unia Tczew players
Association football forwards
Polish expatriate footballers
Expatriate footballers in Germany
Polish expatriate sportspeople in Germany